Organization of Japanese Alaskan Strike Group (Aleutians)

Japanese Navy units in the Alaskan Operation

Commander in Chief, Navy Alaskan Strike Group
Boshiro Hosogaya:-Commander-in-Chief, Navy Alaskan Strike Group, Aleutian Campaign

1st Support Group Commander
Boshiro Hosogaya:-command Heavy Cruiser Nachi and two destroyers

2nd Carrier Squad Commander
Kakuji Kakuta:-Lead, Escort Carriers Ryujo (37 aircraft) (among its fighter pilots aboard were Tadayuki Koga), and Junyo (45 aircraft). Both Carriers were equipped with Mitsubishi A6M2 "Zero" fighters, Aichi D3A1 "Val" Dive-bombers and Nakajima B5N2 "Kate" Torpedo-bombers.

3rd Cruiser Division (2° Section)
Comprising the Cruisers Maya, Takao, and three destroyers

Navy Aleutian Occupation force

Attu Group Commander
Sentaro Omori:-led Light Cruiser Abukuma, four destroyers, one minelayer, one transport (1,200 soldiers)

Kiska Group Commander
Takeo Ono:-Guiding the light cruisers Kiso, Tama, one auxiliary cruiser (Asaka Maru), three destroyers, two minelayers, two transports (1,250 soldiers)

Navy Hidro Fighter unit in Aleutian Operation
5th Air Fleet:-equipped with Nakajima A6M2-N "Rufe" floatplane fighters, support operations from Kiska aquatic base, Aleutian islands.

Japanese Army Units in the Alaskan Operation

North Seas Detachment Commanders
Matsutoshi Hozumi:-He led one infantry battalion whose mission was to occupy the islands of Attu, Kiska, and Adak, in conjunction with naval units.
Juichiro Mineki:-he replaced at Hozumi in command of unit and receiving command of a reinforced group, grown to three infantry battalions, under Commander-in-Chief of the Fifth Fleet.

Last Japanese Navy Infantry Commander in Alaskan Campaign
Yasugo Yamazaki:-commander of last Japanese Navy infantry group in Attu Japanese held island

References 

Pacific Ocean theatre of World War II
Alaskan Strike Group
Aleutian Islands campaign